6TV Telangana is a Telugu news television channel in the Indian State of Telangana. The channel focuses on the culture of Telangana.

History
On 3 July 2014 Hyderabad-based LCGC Broadcasting India headed by Suresh Reddy  launched the Channel for the newly created state Telangana while its sister channel 6TV will have its presence in both the Telugu Speaking States.

Programming and Distribution
The Channel  6TV Telangana will be more localised with news reading in Telugu. The programming will also depicts the lifestyle of  Telangana People. 6TV Telangana will have three bureaus in Hyderabad, Warangal and Nizamabad.

Tragedies
News Reader Ramana who is an active member of the channel had an untimely demise on 3 March 2015. The News reader Ramana died at a very young age of 28 due to heart attack.

References

External links
 https://www.6tvnews.com/

Telugu-language television channels
24-hour television news channels in India
Television channels and stations established in 2014
Television stations in Hyderabad